Chalybea is a genus of plants in the family Melastomataceae with about 11 accepted species. It is found in parts of South and North America, including Peru, Ecuador, Colombia, and Nevada in the US, 

Species accepted (March 2021) include:

Chalybea brevipedunculata 
Chalybea calyptrata 
Chalybea corymbifera 
Chalybea ecuadorensis 
Chalybea kirkbridei 
Chalybea macrocarpa 
Chalybea minor 
Chalybea mutisiana 
Chalybea occidentalis 
Chalybea penduliflora 
Chalybea peruviana

References

 
Melastomataceae genera
Taxonomy articles created by Polbot